The Lithuania national under-18 football team is a feeder team for the main Lithuania national football team.

Summary
U18 team is not training continuously, it is rather assembled for specific tournaments, such as Valentin Granatkin memorial youth tournament in Saint Petersburg in 2013, ″Palangos Juzės″ tournament in 2014 in Palanga, Development Cup 2016 in Minsk, and "The Friendship Cup" in 2019 in Birštonas. The U-18 team was not called up in 2020 and 2021, active national teams were U17, U19 and U21, participating in corresponding UEFA youth championships. In March 2022 a call-up to an U-18 training camp was announced.

Squad
The following players were called up to a training camp in Kaunas on 7–9 March 2022.

|-----
! colspan="9" bgcolor="#B0D3FB" align="left" |
|----- bgcolor="#DFEDFD"

|-----
! colspan="9" bgcolor="#B0D3FB" align="left" |
|----- bgcolor="#DFEDFD"

|-----
! colspan="9" bgcolor="#B0D3FB" align="left" |
|----- bgcolor="#DFEDFD"

External links
 Lithuanian Football Association Official Site (Lithuanian)
 Lithuanian football news, videos, photos Unofficial Site (English)
 All Lithuanian Team Games 1923-1930

References

under-18
European national under-18 association football teams